The American Athletic Conference Men's Basketball Player of the Year is a basketball award given to the American Athletic Conference's most outstanding player. The conference formed in 2013–14 after many schools departed from the original Big East Conference to form their own conference. Shabazz Napier of UConn was the first-ever winner.

Key

Winners

Winners by school

References

NCAA Division I men's basketball conference players of the year
Player Of The Year
Awards established in 2014
2014 establishments in the United States